Mystus vittatus, the striped dwarf catfish, is a species of catfish of the family Bagridae. It is found in brackish water systems with marginal vegetation in lakes and swamps with a mud substrate of Asian countries Pakistan, India, Sri Lanka, Nepal, Bangladesh and probably Myanmar. Populations of Southeast Asian countries is in debate, due to close morphological similarities among Mystus species in that region.

It grows to a length of 21 cm in maximum. The population is known to be decreasing in recent past, due to catching, pet trading and habitat destruction. In reproduction, they are known to makes sounds during spawning.

References 

Bagridae
Catfish of Asia
Fish of South Asia
Freshwater fish of India
Freshwater fish of Sri Lanka
Fish of Bangladesh
Fish described in 1794